Breeana Danielle "Bree" Essrig (born April 21, 1990) is an OnlyFans model and an American actress, writer, host, and internet personality, known for her comedic writing and appearances on the (now defunct) news and current events series SourceFed. Essrig joined SourceFed as a host in 2015, and in 2017 was brought on to star in the daily Twitter series #whatshappening.

Essrig's personal YouTube channel has over 280,000 subscribers and 19 million views. and has appeared in a contest in Seventeen Magazine. She has also been in The Daily Dot, Uproxx, Elizabeth Banks' website WhoHaha, and Amy Poehler's Smart Girls.

Background and personal life

In 2013, Essrig came out publicly as bisexual on The Rubin Report. Since then, she has been a public advocate against bullying, bi-erasure, body shaming, and sexual assault.

Career
Essrig was a co-host on The Young Turks news and pop culture channel PopTrigger from 2012-2015 and a writer/host on SourceFed from 2015-2017. She has acted as a guest host on websites. She has appeared on Elizabeth Banks’ comedy website WhoHaha. Essrig was nominated for a Shorty Award in 2017 for Best Comedian. She has made appearances at festivals and conventions as a celebrity influencer guest, host and commentator. She has appeared in BlackBoxTV Presents and was in Shane Dawson's music video for "Superluv" in 2012.

References

External links

1990 births
20th-century LGBT people
21st-century American comedians
21st-century American women
21st-century LGBT people
Actresses from California
American sketch comedians
American women comedians
American YouTubers
Bisexual actresses
Comedians from California
Bisexual comedians
American LGBT actors
LGBT people from California
LGBT YouTubers
Living people
People from Tarzana, Los Angeles
SourceFed people
American LGBT comedians
American bisexual writers